William Eagan (June 1, 1869 – February 13, 1905) was a professional baseball player who played second base in the Major Leagues from –.

External links

1869 births
1905 deaths
Major League Baseball second basemen
Baseball players from New Jersey
People from Camden, New Jersey
St. Louis Browns (AA) players
Chicago Colts players
Pittsburgh Pirates players
19th-century baseball players
Scranton Miners players
Harrisburg Ponies players
Albany Senators players
Syracuse Stars (minor league baseball) players
Youngstown Little Giants players
Marion Glass Blowers players
Detroit Tigers (Western League) players